Issoufou Habou (born 1945) is a former Nigerien light-middleweight boxer. Habou competed at the 1972 Summer Olympics for Niger. He lost his only match to Mohamed Majeri of Tunisia.

References

1945 births
Living people
Nigerien male boxers
Olympic boxers of Niger
Light-middleweight boxers
Boxers at the 1972 Summer Olympics
20th-century Nigerien people